Hadaway is a surname. Notable people with the surname include:

Elizabeth Hadaway, American poet
Henry Hadaway (born 1942), British record producer
Tom Hadaway (1923–2005), English playwright
William Snelling Hadaway (1872–1941), American artist

See also
Haddaway (born 1965), Trinidadian-German singer